Nowhere Man is a comic limited series from Virgin Comics.

The series will be an odyssey of futurist science fiction, in an epoch where man has traded privacy for safety.  It will be written by Australian actor Hugh Jackman and Marc Guggenheim, who wrote stories for Wolverine and The Amazing Spider-Man and created Eli Stone, with art from Paul Gulacy.

Jackman affirmed in a bulletin that he hopes that Nowhere Man should reach sufficient popularity as to turn into a movie.

Creative team 

Hugh Jackman and Marc Guggenheim: story and script
Paul Gulacy: artist

Release and hype 

Nowhere Man was solicited as launching October 2008.  Virgin Comics hyped the series with a contest called Be a Real Nowhere Man, where fans can win the prize of having their likeness drawn into upcoming issues of Nowhere Man.

References

Virgin Comics titles